Slip Away or Slipped Away may refer to:

Albums
Slip Away (album), an album by Nell (2012)

Songs
"Slip Away" (Clarence Carter song), (1968)
"Slip Away", a song by Ian Lloyd (1979)
"Slip Away", a song by Pat Metheny Group from Letter from Home (1989)
"Slip Away", a song by Raven from Glow (1994)
"Slip Away", a song by Mad Season from the 2013 box-set release of Above (1995)
"Slip Away", a song by	Neil Young from Broken Arrow (1996)
"Slip Away", a song by	Presidents of the United States of America from Pure Frosting (1998)
"Slip Away", a song by	Laurie Anderson from Life on a String (2001)
"Slip Away", a song by	Si*Sé from Si*Sé (2001)
"Slip Away", a song by David Bowie from Heathen (2002)
"Slip Away", a song by	112 from Hot & Wet (2003)
"Slip Away", a song by Sanjoy (2016)
"Slip Away", a song by Perfume Genius from No Shape (2017)

"Slipaway", a section of the song "Street Hassle" by Lou Reed (1978)
"Slip Away (A Warning)", a song by Lou Reed and John Cale from Songs for Drella (1990)
"Slipped Away", a song by Toto from Tambu (1995)
"Slipped Away", a song by Avril Lavigne from Under My Skin (2004)

See also
Slipping Away (disambiguation)